The Battle Creek massacre was a massacre on March 5, 1849, by Mormon settlers of Timpanogo natives at Battle Creek (near present-day Pleasant Grove, Utah). The ambushed Timpanogos were outnumbered and outgunned and had no defense against the militia that crept in and surrounded their camp before dawn. Mormon settlement of Utah Valley came upon the heels of the attack at Battle Creek.

Background

Around February 1849, Dimick B. Huntington spoke with Timpanogo leader Little Chief about some of the settlers' missing cattle. Little Chief said that Roman Nose and Blue Shirt were great thieves who had decided to live off of the settlers' cattle all winter. Little Chief said that the Mormons should kill these renegades, perhaps out of fear that his tribe would be blamed and killed for the missing cattle. On March 1 Captain John Scott took fifty militiamen into Utah Valley to investigate the theft of horses from Brigham Young's herd. They were under orders "to take such measures as would put a final end to their [Indian] depredations in future." They camped in the snow the first night, near Little Cottonwood Canyon, where a rider brought word that the horses had not actually been stolen. Before morning they received orders from Salt Lake City "stating that as the horses were not stolen ... we need not spend any more time in search of them but to proceed with the Indians for killing cattle as had been directed, so that the nature of our expedition was not in the least changed."

On March 2 the men continued southward to Willow Creek (now Draper, Utah) and unanimously agreed to kill a cow from a cattle herd they came upon. The company then continued on to the Jordan River (near the border of present Salt Lake and Utah counties) where they again camped. That day they had learned that the stolen horses had returned to Young's herd. Three times the company had now received word that the Indians had not stolen Young's horses, but they were directed to continue the mission to deal with the stolen/killed cattle issue.

On March 3, Scott's men made their way down the Provo River and asked Little Chief and his camp about where the renegades were. Little Chief's tribe was understandably worried about the fifty armed men, and Little Chief agreed to show Scott where the renegades were. Little Chief's two sons guided Scott's men to the renegade's camp near Battle Creek Canyon.  They prepared for an ambush to be carried out at dawn.

Confrontation

The company divided into four parties, surrounding the encampment. Before gunfire began, there was a verbal exchange with the Indians telling the Mormons to go away and the Mormons telling the Indians to surrender. Gunfire began from the militia, immediately killing the Timpanogo leader. The women and children fled to the stream, where they remained in the cold water during the fighting. The militiamen threw rocks into the brush to coax them out. 

The militiamen started a fire to warm the women and children. One of the young women who was spared pleaded with Huntington to save her brother who was still in the fray. Huntington consented, and she brought her young teenaged brother out of the willows. The boy was initially defiant, but Huntington threatened that if the boy did not surrender their one gun, he would kill him. The boy retrieved the gun from his kinsmen and surrendered it. Shortly thereafter, the three remaining Timpanogo men fled. However, the militia pursued and killed all of the men.

Hearing the reports of gunfire, Little Chief and his men rode to the valley. Upon reaching the scene, he cursed the militiamen for the slaughter. Little Chief warned the settlers that the boy would later kill a white man for revenge.

Aftermath
Most accounts say four Native American men were killed, but Oliver B. Huntington stated there were at least seven killed. The surviving women and children enjoined the militia in their journey back to Salk Lake City. Several settled in the area, but many eventually returned back to their people. 

On March 10, Brigham Young called for 30 families to leave for the Utah Valley and settle the area. The settlement near the site of the March 1849 attack was for years called Battle Creek, until sometime later when the Mormons living there agreed to change the name to Pleasant Grove.

Years later, a mountain man named Joshua Terry, who had married an Native American woman, told writer and Pleasant Grove native Howard R. Driggs that the Ute boy that was captured grew up to become Ute war chief Antonga Black Hawk. Following the Black Hawk War, Black Hawk confided in Terry that he could never understand why the white men had shot down his people. It put bitterness in his heart; and though he lived for some time with the white people, his mind had been set on avenging the wrong.

Old Elk and Stick-in-the-Head, leaders of local Timpanogos tribes, watched the settlers "relentlessly shoot down" the Utes. This contributed to their later mistrust of the settlers during the events preceding the Battle at Fort Utah.

See also 
Battle at Fort Utah
Act for the relief of Indian Slaves and Prisoners

Notes

References 

 On the Mormon Frontier, The Diary of Hosea Stout, 1844–1861, Vol. 2, Edited by Juanita Brooks, University of Utah Press, 1964, pages 344-347
 Diary of Oliver B. Huntington, 1847–1900, Vol. 2, L. Tom Perry Special Collections Library, Brigham Young University, Provo, Utah, pages 47–55 & 331-341
 Dimick Baker Huntington, Statement on Battle Creek Fight, January 1, 1862, MS 4085, LDS Archives
 LDS Journal History (May be read at LDS Church History Library)
 History of Utah in Four Volumes, Orson F. Whitney, March 1892, page 423 (Held at Harold B. Lee Library, Brigham Young University, Provo, Utah)
 Autobiography of Pioneer John Brown, 1820–1896, Arranged & Published by his son, John Zimmerman Brown, 1941, pages 103-105
 Provo, Pioneer Mormon City, compiled by ... Writers Program ... for the state of Utah, copyright 1942 Provo City Commission, pages 36–44
 Timpanogos Town, Story of Old Battle Creek and Pleasant Grove, Utah, Howard R. Driggs, 1948, pages 14–23
 The Forgotten Kingdom, The Mormon Theocracy in the American West, 1847–1896, David L. Bigler, 1998, pages 66–68
 Founding Fort Utah, Provo's Native Inhabitants, Early Explorers, and first Year of Settlement, D. Robert Carter, 2003, Provo City Corporation, pages 60–67

External links 
 
 Pleasant Grove City's Account of the Battle Creek Attack Click on "Prelude to Settlement, The Battle Creek Battle" for this account
 Phillip B. Gottfredson's Account of the Battle Creek Attack

Conflicts in 1849
Mormonism and violence
Mormonism and Native Americans
Mormonism-related controversies
Pre-statehood history of Utah
The Church of Jesus Christ of Latter-day Saints in Utah
Timpanogos tribe
Massacres of Native Americans
Wars fought in Utah
March 1849 events